Hans Hugo Klein (born 5 August 1936 in Karlsruhe) is a German politician. He was a representative of the German Christian Democratic Union from 1983 to 1996 and he a justice of the Federal Constitutional Court.

Life
Klein studied law in Heidelberg and Munich, where he graduated with his Ph.D. in 1961. Then he moved to the Management Service of Baden-Wuerttemberg, lost but not the scientific career from his eyes, which led 1967 Habilitation on the topic "Participation of the state in economic competition with Ernst Forsthoff at the University of Heidelberg. In 1969 Hans Hugo Klein became a professor for Public Law at the University of Göttingen. In 1970, he joined the CDU, where he was the German Bundestag from 1972 to 1983. He moved in 1972, 1976 and 1980, one of the Land of Lower Saxony CDU in parliament, winning 1983, the direct mandate in the constituency of Göttingen.

From 1982 to 1983 he was among Hans A. Engelhard also Parliamentary Secretary in the Ministry of Justice.

In 1983 he was appointed as a judge of the Constitutional Court. During his tenure at the Federal Klein belonged to the Second Senate of the court. His responsibilities with the Federal Party were right, the right of the public service and staff representation rights. He was succeeded by Hans-Joachim Jentsch.

For constitutional matters Hans Hugo Klein believes that it is acting in the Basic Law for a mixed constitution. Mixed is the democratic constitutional state in the Federal Republic of Germany, since democracy is not absolutely true. Particular importance come to the concept of representative democracy. The political parties were in the process, despite the criticism is often practiced in them, constitutionally necessary component of liberal democracy.

See also
List of German Christian Democratic Union politicians

References

External links
 Christlich Demokratische Union Deutschlands web site

Christian Democratic Union of Germany politicians
Justices of the Federal Constitutional Court
1936 births
Living people
Grand Crosses with Star and Sash of the Order of Merit of the Federal Republic of Germany
Members of the Bundestag 1972–1976
Members of the Bundestag 1976–1980
Members of the Bundestag 1980–1983
Members of the Bundestag 1983–1987